Aancistroger is a genus of Orthopterans, sometimes known as 'leaf-folding crickets' in the newly erected subfamily Hyperbaeninae and tribe Phryganogryllacridini.  A key to the species is given by Bian, Jing Liu & Zizhong Yang, with a recorded distribution from China and Indochina.

Note this genus name should not be confused with Anancistrogera in the tribe Gryllacridini.

Species 
The Orthoptera Species File lists:
 Aancistroger elbenioides (Karny, 1926)
 Aancistroger inarmatus Ingrisch, 2018
 Aancistroger primitivus Gorochov, 2005
 Aancistroger similis Gorochov, 2008
 Aancistroger sinicus Bey-Bienko, 1957 - type species
 Aancistroger vietus Gorochov, 2004

References

External links

Ensifera genera
Gryllacrididae
Orthoptera of Indo-China